Georg Tage Eugen von Boisman (12 August 1910 – 4 April 1985) was a Swedish modern pentathlete. He competed at the 1936 Summer Olympics and finished tenth.

References

External links
 

1910 births
1985 deaths
Swedish male modern pentathletes
Olympic modern pentathletes of Sweden
Modern pentathletes at the 1936 Summer Olympics
Sportspeople from Umeå
Swedish Army generals